Haplogroup CF, also known as CF-P143 and CT(xDE), is a human Y-chromosome DNA haplogroup. This paternal lineage is defined by the SNP P143. The clade's existence and distribution are inferred from the fact that haplogroups descended from CF include most human male lineages in Eurasia, Oceania and The Americas.

CF is an immediate descendant of the Haplogroup CT (CT-M168), and is the sibling of Haplogroup DE (DE-YAP). It is the immediate ancestor of both Haplogroup C and Haplogroup F.

There are, as yet, no confirmed cases of living individuals or human remains belonging to the basal, undivergent haplogroup CF*. In the year 2017, C-M217 (C2) & C-M130 were reported among males belonging to the Shan peoples, who are concentrated in central-east Burma (as well as neighboring parts of China, Laos and Thailand). However, the researchers concerned (Brunelli et al.) did not rule out all other subclades of CF, such as haplogroup F, in these particular cases. (In haplogroup F2 has previously been identified in the same geographical region.)

Distribution

See also

Genetics

Y-DNA C subclades

Y-DNA backbone tree

References

CF